Kapf is a common local name, especially in the Alemannian area, for a mountain or hill with good views or a settlement on such a place. It may be related to Kopf, the German word for "head". In Switzerland, the variant Gupf is widespread.

Kapf may refer to:

 Kapf (Egenhausen) (625.4 m), in the Black Forest near Egenhausen, county of Calw, Baden-Württemberg, Germany
 Kapf (Oberegg AI), hamlet in the municipality of Oberegg AI, Appenzell Innerrhoden, Switzerland
 Kapf (Krinau), hamlet in the municipality of Krinau, Toggenburg, St. Gallen, Switzerland
 Roland Kapf (born 1937), German sprint canoer
 Naples Municipal Airport, Florida (by ICAO airport code)